Princess Hyohye (13 June 1511 - 6 May 1531), born Yi Ok-ha, was a Joseon Dynasty princess as the daughter of King Jungjong and Queen Janggyeong. She was the older sister of Injong of Joseon.

Biography

Early life 
Yi Ok-ha was born on 13 June 1511, as the eldest child and only daughter of King Jungjong and Queen Janggyeong. It was said that she was affectionately doted on by her father.

At the age of 4, she lost her mother to postpartum sickness after the birth of her younger brother, Crown Prince Yi Ho, on March 10, 1515. After her mother’s death, the Princess was raised by her maternal aunt, Princess Consort Paepyeong, wife of Yi Yi, Prince Deokpung, and by Royal Consort Gwi-in of the Uiryeong Nam clan, one of King Seongjong's concubines. Before Queen Janggyeong died, she gave her sister, Princess Consort Paepyeong, Princess Hyohye’s property. Saying that once the young princess grew up, Princess Hyohye should give it to her daughter. 

In 1517, her father remarried, and Queen Munjeong became her step-mother. She had five younger half-siblings, which included the future King Myeongjong.

But when Princess Consort Paepyeong was on her deathbed in 1536, she distributed some of Princess Hyohye’s property to her own son, Yi Yi, Prince Gyerim, and the rest to the princess. But the princess was dissatisfied with the distribution of property, she later complained to Queen Munjeong, and Queen Munjeong summoned Prince Gyerim and rebuked him. 

Prince Gyerim was hated by Queen Munjeong and was eventually executed in 1545 for being involved in Eulsasahwa.

Marriage 
On December 14, 1520, there was a selection for the husband of the Princess (부마 간택), and Kim Hui, son of Kim Ahn-ro, from the Yeonan Kim clan was selected and was later honoured as Prince Consort Yeonseong (연성위, 延城尉). They were married in November 1521.

Later life 
In 1528, when she was 17 years old, she suffered from dysentery and was concerned about this and focused on getting treatment.

On May 6, 1531, at the age of 19, Princess Hyohye gave birth to a daughter, named Kim Seon-ok, but she died not long after, due to her postpartum illness. Her husband also died later in that same year. It is said that the country was in silence for three days, after the news of the Princess’ death.

She is buried on a hill left from Grand Prince Wolsan’s tomb, in Goyang, South Korea.

Aftermath 
Her younger brother, King Injong, died of unknown causes, after ruling for 9 months. In an unofficial chronicle it is said that when Injong went to pay his morning respects, Queen Munjeong's face started radiating with a smile only a mother could give to her child. Injong took it as a sign that the Queen Dowager was finally acknowledging him as the King, and in particular as her own son. He ate the ddeok that his step-mother gave him, not knowing that it would be the beginning of the end. He fell ill slowly, not enough to create any suspicion, but quickly enough that historians would later pick up on the event.

The daughter of the Princess, Kim Seon-ok, eventually married Yun Baek-won, the son of Yun Won-ro and Queen Munjeong's nephew. They had one daughter, Yun Gaemi-chi.

During Myeongjong’s reign, Yun Baek-won joined Yi Ryang's faction and was later exiled after trying to get rid of the Sarim faction. However in 1565, Queen Munjeong ordered him to move to a nearby location, Geun-do, because he was Princess Hyohye's only son-in-law.

In 1589, Yun Baek-won died mysteriously and Yun Gaemi-chi was suspected of poisoning her father. Yun was later sentenced for the crime, but soon died while serving. Thirteen years later in 1602, Lady Yun’s son appealed to the government over his mother’s death saying that it was an unfair one. It was later revealed that Yun Baek-won’s illegitimate sons were the culprits behind the poisoning of his grandfather, and put the blame onto their older half-sister.

Family
Father: Yi Yeok, Jungjong of Joseon (16 April 1488 - 29 November 1544) (조선 중종왕)
Grandfather: Yi Hyeol, Seongjong of Joseon (20 August 1457 - 20 January 1494) (조선 성종왕)
Grandmother: Yun Chang-yeon, Queen Jeonghyeon of the Papyeong Yun clan (21 July 1462 - 13 September 1530) (정현왕후 윤씨)
Mother: Yun Myeong-hye, Queen Janggyeong of the Papyeong Yun clan (10 August 1491 - 16 March 1515) (장경왕후 윤씨)
Grandfather: Yun Yeo-pil, Internal Prince Pawon (1466 - 1555) (윤여필 파원부원군)
Grandmother: Internal Princess Consort Suncheon of the Suncheon Park clan (순천부부인 순천 박씨) (? - 1498)
Sibling
Younger brother: Yi Ho, Injong of Joseon (10 March 1515 - 7 August 1545)
Sister-in-law: Queen Inseon of the Bannam Park clan (7 October 1514 - 6 January 1578) — No issue.
Husband: Kim Hui, Prince Consort Yeonseong (김희 연성위, 金禧 延城尉) (? - 1531)
Father-in-law: Kim Ahn-ro (김안로, 金安老) (1481 - 27 October 1537)
Mother-in-law: Lady Chae of the Incheon Chae clan (인천 채씨)
 Issue
 Daughter: Kim Seon-ok (김선옥, 金善玉), Lady Kim of the Yeonan Kim clan (연안 김씨, 延安 金氏) (6 May 1531 - ?)
 Son-in-law: Yun Baek-won (윤백원, 尹百源) (1528 - 1589)
 Granddaughter: Yun Gaemi-chi (윤개미치, 尹介未致), Lady Yun of the Paepyeong Yun clan (파평 윤씨, 坡平 尹氏) (? - 1589)
 Unnamed great-grandson

References

1511 births
1531 deaths
Princesses of Joseon
Deaths in childbirth
16th-century Korean people
16th-century Korean women